Valéry Giroux (born 24 March 1974) is a Canadian philosopher, lawyer and animal rights activist from Quebec.

Education and career 
After obtaining her law degree from the Université de Montréal in 1997, Giroux became a member of the Bar of Quebec in 2001. From an interest in issues surrounding animal rights, she began a master's degree in law at the Université de Montréal, with a thesis on a project to reform the cruelty to animals offences of the Canadian Criminal Code. She then undertook doctoral studies in philosophy at the Université de Montréal and devoted her doctoral thesis, which was supervised by Christine Tappolet, to the extension of the most fundamental human rights to all sentient beings; the thesis, the first in Quebec in animal ethics, was published in book form by Éditions L'Âge d'Homme in 2017.

Giroux is an adjunct professor at the Université de Montréal Faculty of Law. She is also associate director for the Centre de recherche en éthique ("Ethics Research Center") and a Fellow of the Oxford Centre for Animal Ethics. She is the author of the book Contre l'exploitation animale ("Against Animal Exploitation") and the co-author, with Renan Larue, of the book Le Véganisme ("Veganism") in the PUF editorial collection "Que sais-je?" ("What do I know?) and a book in the same collection, L'antispécisme ("Antispeciesism"). Giroux is regularly invited to speak to the media on issues relating to animal ethics. She is co-editor of the French-language journal L'Amorce ("The Primer") which focuses on antispeciesism.

Philosophy 
Giroux's philosophy is antispeciesist, in that she argues against discriminating against sentient beings because they lack human species membership. She furthermore asserts that cognitive capacity, or lack thereof, has no moral relevance, stating "[y]ou can't use these characteristics to place more or less value on individuals; the proof is that we do not grant more fundamental rights to the most intelligent human beings."

Giroux is opposed to welfarism and considers herself to be an abolitionist when it comes to animal rights. She opposes Alasdair Cochrane's position on the right to freedom of non-human animals, for whom animals have only an interest in being free when the absence of freedom is the cause of suffering for them. Conversely, Giroux maintains that the interest in being free from all sentient agents (human or nonhuman) is of the same nature. This is at least the case, according to her, as soon as one abandons the concept of positive freedom (being the ultimate master of one's will and actions) in favor of that of negative freedom (not being subjected to external constraints) or of republican freedom (not to be subjected to domination). And this interest to be free, she argues, must be protected by the individual right to freedom for all sentient beings, whether they belong to humanity or not.

Awards 
In 2018, Giroux received the 1st Prize for the Research Professionals Excellence award from the Fonds de recherche du Québec – Société et culture (FRQSC).

Selected Bibliography 

 Contre l'exploitation animale ("Against Animal Exploitation"; Éditions L'Âge d'Homme, 2017) 
 with Émilie Dardenne and Enrique Utria. Peter Singer et la libération animale. Quarante ans plus tard ("Peter Singer and animal liberation. Forty years later"; Presses universitaires de Rennes, 2017) 
 with Renan Larue. Le Véganisme ("Veganism"; PUF, 2017) 
 L'antispécisme ("Antispeciesism"; PUF, 2020)

References

External links 
 

1974 births
Living people
21st-century Canadian lawyers
21st-century Canadian philosophers
21st-century women lawyers
Animal ethicists
Canadian animal rights activists
Canadian animal rights scholars
Canadian veganism activists
Canadian women activists
Canadian women lawyers
Canadian women philosophers
Lawyers in Quebec
Université de Montréal alumni
Academic staff of the Université de Montréal
Academic staff of the Université de Sherbrooke